Komlói Bányász Sport Klub is a Hungarian football club based in Komló.

History
Komlói Bányász SK first played in the 1957–58 season of the Hungarian League and finished thirteenth.

Name changes
1922: Komló SC
1931–1949: Komlói SE
1949–1950: Komlói Tárna Sport Egyesület
1950–1951: Komlói Szakszervezeti Sport Egyesület
1951–present: Komlói Bányász SK

Honours
 Magyar Kupa:
 Runners-up (2): 1970, 1973–74

European cup history

External links
 Profil

References

Football clubs in Hungary
Association football clubs established in 1922
1922 establishments in Hungary
Mining association football clubs in Hungary